The Opening Ceremony of the XV Pan American Games took place on 13 July 2007. Considered an audition for the 2014 World Cup and 2016 Olympics, the Opening Ceremony was praised by the media for its creativity and Olympic-style production value. The Los Angeles Times reported:
Brazil's 2nd largest city still must overcome doubts about crime and traffic, among other things, if it hopes to make good on its quixotic bid to play host to the 2016 Olympic Games. But Rio sure has the opening ceremony down pat. On Friday the city inaugurated the 15th Pan American Games with a lavish and creative 3½ -hour show that featured a symphony orchestra, three 100-foot-long coral snakes, Miss Brazil, an alligator the size of a 747, fireworks, a 1,500-piece percussion band and thousands of dancers dressed as everything from ocean waves to water lilies.

Approximately 90,000 spectators and 5,000 athletes packed Rio de Janeiro's Maracanã Stadium for the occasion. The ceremony included a cast of 4,000 and a $17 million (US) budget. The Executive Producer of the Opening Ceremony was Scott Givens. More than 250 people were part of the creative and production teams with another 1,000 backstage volunteers. Scott Givens' team was responsible for   the Opening Ceremony, Sports Production, the presentation of 2,252 medals, Sports Production and the Closing Ceremony.

The theme of the show was based on the theme of the Rio 2007 Games:  Viva Essa Energia (Share this Energy).

Proceedings
The show began at 17:30 local time (UTC-3) and lasted for two and a half hours.

The beginning had the Dragoons of Independence, the first regiment of the Brazilian army and the official guard of the Republic's president, bringing a Brazilian flag and an execution of the Brazilian national anthem sung by Elza Soares, the former wife of football player Mané Garrincha. The countdown, starting with the number 15, showed the cities which hosted the American event.

The first part was named "Viva essa energia" (Live this energy in Portuguese). And started with an afro-Brazilian boy named Cainan playing a tambour and guiding 1,150 rhythmists from the 17 Samba schools and presenting the official song of the XV Pan American Games, "Viva essa Energia", composed by Arnaldo Antunes, former singer the Brazilian rock band Titãs, and Liminha, singer the Brazilian rock band Os Mutantes, and sung by Ana Costa samba singer.

The parade of the athletes had a rhythm of a samba, chorinho and the bossa nova's rhythm played by the battery of samba schools which made a huge corridor when the athletes from the 42 nations passed between them. There was expectation about the entry of Panama's delegation due to interference by the Panamanian government on their national Olympic committee, the IOC have banned the participation of the country in official events but the PASO required the Panamanian athletes to participate using their organization's flag, so the IOC came back to the decision and authorised the participation of Panama.

At this games were created the PASO's anthem, composed by André Mehmari and performed by Orquestra Sinfônica Brasileira conducted by Roberto Minczuk.

The show were divided in three parts: "A energia do Sol" (The energy of sun), "A energia da água" (the energy of water), and "A energia do homem" (The man's energy). The show was coordinated by Rosa Magalhães from the Rio de Janeiro samba school GRES Imperatriz Leopoldinense.

The oath of the athletes was performed by Brazilian taekwondo athlete Natália Falavigna.

Contrary to plan and tradition, the games were not opened by Brazil's head of state, President Luiz Inácio Lula da Silva, but by the head of the Brazilian Olympic Committee, Carlos Arthur Nuzman. Prior to the official opening, Lula had been repeatedly booed whenever the in-stadium camera showed him on the large screen set up inside the stadium.

Parade of Nations

References

External links
 Opening ceremony video
 Parade of Nations

See also 
 2006 Asian Games opening ceremony
 2008 Summer Olympics opening ceremony
 2016 Summer Olympics opening ceremony
 2016 Summer Olympics Parade of Nations

Opening Ceremony
Pan American Games opening ceremonies
Ceremonies in Brazil